Pinocchio and the Emperor of the Night is a 1987 American animated fantasy adventure film that was released on December 25, 1987, by New World Pictures. Created by Filmation, the film was conceived as a sequel to the 1883 Italian classic novel The Adventures of Pinocchio by Carlo Collodi, being set a year after Pinocchio became a real boy. It was also described by some as a "thinly-veiled" sequel to Disney's 1940 classic Pinocchio. Disney sued Filmation for copyright infringement, but Filmation won the lawsuit on the grounds that Collodi's work is in the public domain.

The film received generally negative reviews from critics during its initial release and underperformed at the box office, costing $10 million but making $3.2 million in its entire run. However, in subsequent years, the film has retained a cult following.

Plot 
A bumblebee named Lieutenant Grumblebee is woken from his sleep by the arrival of a large sinister-looking ship. A man named Puppetino, a puppet-master, remarks that this is the ideal spot for the carnival. Stakes and ropes fly from the ship and a circus tent forms. Grumblebee hastily leaves the area.

A year after being made human by his Fairy Godmother, the boy Pinocchio celebrates his first birthday with Mister Geppetto. The Good Fairy appears and teaches Pinocchio that love is his most powerful gift. She brings to life one of Pinocchio's own carvings, a wooden glow-bug, to act as Pinocchio's conscience. Pinocchio, surprised, exclaims "Gee willikers!" and the bug takes the name "Willikers". After the party, Pinocchio offers to deliver a jewel box to the mayor for Geppetto. En route he encounters con men Sylvester J. Scalawag the raccoon and Igor the monkey, who trick him into trading the box for the "Pharaoh's Ruby". The ruby turns out to be a fake and Geppetto is furious. Pinocchio runs away in shame, leaving Willikers behind.

Pinocchio looks for work at the carnival and is entranced by a blonde marionette named Twinkle. Puppetino recognises Pinocchio and uses Twinkle to lure him into joining the carnival. Puppetino starts playing an organ grinder, causing Pinocchio to dance uncontrollably and slowly transform back into a puppet. Puppetino attaches strings to Pinocchio's hands and feet, completing the transformation, and hangs the now lifeless Pinocchio alongside Twinkle. The Good Fairy appears and awakens Pinocchio, explaining that he lost his freedom because he took it for granted. She reminds him of the importance of choice before restoring him to human form.

Pinocchio decides to retrieve the jewel box. Willikers objects, so Pinocchio sets him aside and travels alone. Willikers encounters Grumblebee again, whom takes him to his home in Bugsburgh. Pinocchio encounters Scalawag and Igor again, whom inform him that the box is at the carnival, which has returned to the ship. The trio pursue the carnival ship by boat. Unbeknownst to Pinocchio, they plan to hand him over to Puppetino in return for a reward, but after Pinocchio saves them from a giant barracuda, they change their minds and begin to genuinely bond with Pinocchio. As they travel, the carnival ship arrives, capturing the boat. Willikers, carried to the river by Grumblebee, latches onto Pinocchio's pocket as they drift into the ship.

Scalawag recognizes the ship as the Empire of the Night. A boatman offers Pinocchio a ride to the jewel box, leaving Scalawag and Igor behind. The boatman says the box is in the opposite, darker end of a cavern. Pinocchio prefers the brighter path, and they row to the "Neon Cabaret". A doorman says that Pinocchio can play inside if he signs a contract. He impulsively agrees, runs inside and finds a room full of partying children. Pinocchio drinks from a fountain of green liquid that causes him to hallucinate and black out. He awakens on a stage; a ringmaster tells him his fans are waiting and he begins dancing. Scalawag and Igor, who have followed Pinocchio, try to get his attention, but are drawn offstage while he is distracted by Twinkle. Pinocchio bows to thunderous applause.

Puppetino appears and Pinocchio turns to find the boatman, who transforms into the doorman and then the ringmaster. He tells Pinocchio that he has reached the "Land Where Dreams Come True" and then morphs into a floating being with four arms called the Emperor of the Night. He demands Pinocchio sign a contract that will make him a puppet again, a choice that will weaken the Good Fairy to her death. Pinocchio refuses and is imprisoned with Scalawag and Igor. Scalawag laments that they have succumbed to their desires without considering the consequences. The Emperor reveals to Pinocchio that Geppetto has been shrunk to fit inside the jewel box. Pinocchio offers to sign the contract if the Emperor frees Geppetto and the others. Pinocchio signs away his freedom, transforming back into a living puppet.

The Emperor betrays Pinocchio, telling him that the freedom of choice gives him his power. Pinocchio turns on the Emperor and a blue aura – the light of the Good Fairy – surrounds him. The Emperor shoots bolts of flame at Pinocchio, but the blue light protects him as the ship catches fire. Pinocchio escapes with his friends while the Emperor shoots Puppetino in the back with a bolt of magic for his instant cowardice while he runs for his life. Puppetino turns into a lifeless puppet, and burns to death immediately thereafter.

The evil Emperor promises to make Geppetto pay for Pinocchio's choices, but he runs and forms into a blue shining orb and plunges into the Emperor's flaming figure, destroying him and his ship. On the shore, Geppetto has returned to his original size. Scalawag and Igor find Pinocchio, who is once again a real boy. The Good Fairy appears, proudly telling Pinocchio that he no longer needs her. She presents the jewel box to Geppetto. She reveals the now human Twinkle awakening nearby before fading away to the sunrise, leaving the group to celebrate.

Cast 
 Scott Grimes – Pinocchio
 James Earl Jones – The Emperor of the Night
 Don Knotts – Gee Willikers, an anthropomorphic glow-bug
 Tom Bosley – Mister Geppetto, Pinocchio's "father"
 Rickie Lee Jones – The Good Fairy, Pinocchio's fairy godmother
 Ed Asner – Sylvester J. Scalawag, an anthropomorphic raccoon and a trickster
 Frank Welker – Igor, an anthropomorphic monkey, a thief and Scalawag's sidekick. Welker did also voice the anthropomorphic mayor of Bugsburgh.
 Lana Beeson – Twinkle, a female puppet
 Linda Gary – Bee-Atrice, an anthropomorphic female bumblebee
 Jonathan Harris – Lt. Grumblebee, an anthropomorphic male bumblebee and lieutenant of the RAB ("Royal Air Bugs")
 William Windom – Puppetino, an evil puppet-master

Release

Critical reception 
The movie received generally negative reviews from critics during its initial release.

Writing for the Chicago Tribune, Dave Kehr labelled it a "wooden effort" and concluded there was "little reason to bother with Pinocchio and the Emperor of the Night given that the genuine article is readily available on videotape".

Janet Maslin of the New York Times called it "Saturday morning animation at best" and also compared it unfavorably with Disney's version.

Charles Solomon of the Los Angeles Times wrote that the script and direction lacked focus and felt the movie "illustrates just how badly the American animated feature has degenerated".

Juan Carlos Coto praised the performances of Rickie Lee Jones and James Earl Jones, but felt the plot was mostly "Saturday-morning rehash" and also urged readers to watch the Disney movie instead.

Leonard Maltin seemed to agree, declaring that "Some striking animation is wasted on this uninspired 'sequel' to Disney's 1940 gem...Even at its best, this is an embarrassment compared to Uncle Walt's predecessor."

The Morning Call'''s reviewer was more favorable, opining that "it does dazzle and sparkle in all the right places", adding "there is much to recommend the new film". M. J. Simpson praised the "engaging story, likeable characters... genuine tension and horror, reasonable songs and... terrific animation" and gave it a B+ rating.Pinocchio and the Emperor of the Night was described as a "thinly veiled sequel" to Disney's 1940 classic Pinocchio''; one reviewer noted its many similarities to the original and imagined "legions of lawyers poring over every frame". Disney sued Filmation for copyright infringement, but lost after Filmation successfully argued that Carlo Collodi's characters were in the public domain. In the years after its initial release, the film has  since retained a cult following.

Box office 
The film opened on Christmas in 1987 in 1,182 theaters, and made $602,734 on its opening weekend for an average of $510 per theater, 18.48% percent of the final gross of $3,261,638 in the United States.

Songs

Availability 
There are currently no DVD releases of this film in North America as of 2022. However, it is available to view on streaming channels like Amazon Prime and Pluto TV for free.

References

External links 

Video Detective trailer

1987 films
1987 animated films
1980s American animated films
1987 fantasy films
1980s musical films
Filmation animated films
New World Pictures films
Pinocchio films
Films set in the 1880s
American children's animated adventure films
American children's animated fantasy films
American children's animated musical films
American fantasy adventure films
Films scored by Anthony Marinelli
Animated films based on children's books
1980s children's animated films
Animated films directed by Hal Sutherland
Circus films
1980s English-language films
Films produced by Lou Scheimer